Daallo Airlines is a Somali-owned airline based at Dubai Airport Free Zone in Al Garhoud, Dubai, United Arab Emirates. With its main hub at the Djibouti–Ambouli International Airport, the airline operates scheduled services in the Horn of Africa and the Middle East.

History
Daallo Airlines was established in 1991 in Djibouti by Mohamed Haji Abdillahi Abusita and Mohammed Ibrahim Yassin Olad. It began operations on 20 March 1991. , the carrier had 42 employees; its fleet was composed of two Antonov An-24RV, one Let 410 UVP-E and two Tupolev Tu-154M that served Berbera, Borama, Bossaso, Dire Dawa, Djibouti, Dubai, Hargeisa, Jeddah, Mogadishu, and Sharjah.

As of March 2007, Daallo Airlines had 110 employees. The carrier received new shareholders later in the year, the Dubai World subsidiary Istithmar World Aviation. Founders and owners Mohamed Haji Abdillahi "Abusita" and Mohammed Ibrahim Yasin "Olaad" remained as board members. In December 2008, Terry Fox, who had served as Director of Operations, was appointed Chief Executive Officer. The company maintained service on its main European route to Paris CDG and London Gatwick from Djibouti until 2009. In March 2010, all flight operations were suspended, but service resumed later in the year.

In February 2015, Daallo Airlines merged with Jubba Airways to form the new holding company African Airways Alliance. Both airlines continue to operate under separate brands.

Destinations
As of February 2021, Daallo Airlines serves the following scheduled destinations:

Previously, Daallo also operated flights to Europe, serving London-Gatwick and Paris-Charles de Gaulle.

Fleet

Current fleet
As of February 2021, the Daalloo Airlines fleet consists of the following aircraft:

Former fleet
Daallo Airlines formerly also operated the following wide range of owned or leased aircraft types:
 Airbus A320-200
 Airbus A321-200
 Antonov An-12
 Antonov An-24
 Ilyushin Il-18
 Ilyushin Il-76 
 Boeing 727-200
 Boeing 747SP
 Boeing 757-200
 Boeing 767
 British Aerospace 146-200
 Let L-410 Turbolet
 McDonnell Douglas MD-83
 Tupolev Tu-154

Accidents and incidents

References

External links

Official website

 
1991 establishments in Djibouti
Airlines banned in the European Union
Airlines of Somalia
Airlines of Djibouti
Airlines established in 1991
Companies based in Dubai